An election was held on November 6, 2012 to elect all 21 members of the Delaware Senate. The election coincided with the elections for other offices, including the Presidency,  U.S. Senate, U.S. House of Representatives, Governor, and State House. The primary election was held on September 11, 2012.

Results Summary

Detailed results

District 1
Incumbent Democrat Harris McDowell III has represented the 1st district since 1977.

District 2
Incumbent Democrat Margaret Rose Henry has represented the 2nd district since 1994.

District 3
Incumbent Democrat Robert Marshall has represented the 3rd district since 1979.

District 4
The new 4th district includes the homes of incumbent Democrat Michael Katz, who has represented the 4th district since 2009, and Republican Liane Sorenson, who has represented the 6th district since 1995. Sorenson didn't seek re-election. Katz lost re-election here to Republican Gregory Lavelle.

District 5
Incumbent Republican Catherine Cloutier has represented the 5th district since 2001.

District 6
The new 6th district is based in the Cape Region in costal Sussex County, and includes Rehoboth Beach, Lewes, and Milton. The district has no incumbent. Republican Ernesto Lopez won the open seat.

District 7
Incumbent Democrat Patti Blevins has represented the 7th district since 1991.

District 8
Incumbent Democrat David Sokola has represented the 8th district since 1991.

District 9
Incumbent Democrat Karen Peterson has represented the 9th district since 2003.

District 10
Incumbent Democrat Bethany Hall-Long has represented the 10th district since 2009.

District 11
Incumbent Democrat  President pro tempore Tony DeLuca has represented the 11th district since 1999. DeLuca lost re-nomination to fellow Democrat Bryan Townsend. Townsend won the general election.

District 12
Incumbent Republican Dorinda Connor has represented the 12th district since 1997. Connor lost re-election to Democrat Nicole Poore.

District 13
Incumbent Democrat Majority Leader David McBride has represented the 13th district since 1979.

District 14
Incumbent Democrat Bruce Ennis has represented the 14th district since 2007.

District 15
Incumbent Republican David Lawson has represented the 15th district since 2011.

District 16
Incumbent Republican Colin Bonini has represented the 16th district since 1995.

District 17
Incumbent Democrat Brian Bushweller has represented the 17th district since 2009.

District 18
Incumbent Republican Minority Leader Gary Simpson has represented the 18th district since 1999.

District 19
Incumbent Republican Joseph Booth has represented the 19th district since 2013. Booth lost re-nomination to fellow Republican Eric Bodenweiser. Bodenweiser later withdrew from the general election and was replaced on the ballot by Brian Pettyjohn. Pettyjohn won the general election.

District 20
Incumbent Democrat George Bunting has represented the 20th district since 1997. Bunting retired and Republican Gerald Hocker won the open seat.

District 21
Incumbent Democrat Robert Venables Sr. has represented the 21st district since 1989.

References

Notes

Delaware Senate
State Senate
2012